is a former Japanese football player.

Playing career
Goshi was born in Shizuoka Prefecture on December 19, 1966. After graduating from high school, he joined Japan Soccer League club Hitachi (later Kashiwa Reysol) in 1985. In 1992, Japan Soccer League was folded and the club joined new league, Japan Football League. In 1994, the club won second place and was promoted to the J1 League. He played as goalkeeper for the club for 11 seasons until 1995, and then retired at the end of that season.

Club statistics

References

External links

1966 births
Living people
Association football people from Shizuoka Prefecture
Japanese footballers
Japan Soccer League players
J1 League players
Japan Football League (1992–1998) players
Kashiwa Reysol players
Association football goalkeepers